South Woodham Ferrers railway station is on the Crouch Valley Line in the East of England, serving the town of South Woodham Ferrers, Essex. The Engineer's Line Reference for the line is WIS; the station's three-letter station code is SOF. The platform has an operational length for eight-coach trains.

The line and station were opened on 1 June 1889 for goods and on 1 October 1889 for passenger services by the Great Eastern Railway. The station was originally named Woodham Ferris; this was changed  to Woodham Ferrers on 1 October 1913, and to South Woodham Ferrers on 20 May 2007. The station had two platforms connected by a footbridge; a goods yard; and a 36-lever signal box. The goods yard closed in 1964. The south platform, goods loop, footbridge and signal box were decommissioned on 21 January 1967. The level crossing immediately to the east of the station was converted to automatic-opening on 9 March 1986 and to automatic half-barriers on 4 April 1993. Electrification of the Wickford to Southminster line using 25 kV overhead line electrification (OLE) was completed on 12 May 1986.

Today the station is managed by Greater Anglia, which also operates all trains serving it.

The Engineer's Line Reference for the former Maldon Branch is WFM (Woodham Ferrers-Maldon). When the station was opened in 1889 by the Great Eastern Railway it was intended to serve the nearby village of Woodham Ferrers, despite being located a few miles to the south. However, with subsequent development of the surrounding area into the new, and much larger, town of South Woodham Ferrers, the station now serves both.

References

External links

Website of The Friends of South Woodham Ferrers Station
History of the Crouch Valley Line
Local information about Crouch Valley Line

Railway stations in Essex
DfT Category C2 stations
Former Great Eastern Railway stations
Greater Anglia franchise railway stations
Railway stations in Great Britain opened in 1889
William Neville Ashbee railway stations
South Woodham Ferrers